"I'd Like To" is a song by English singer-songwriter Corinne Bailey Rae from her self-titled debut studio album (2006). It was released on 12 February 2007 as the album's fourth and final commercial single. It was released digitally in Mexico on 19 February 2007. In the United States, the song was serviced to hot adult contemporary radio on 11 June 2007.

"I'd Like To" was released in a slightly remixed and edited form for the single release. It became Rae's first single to miss the top 75 of the UK Singles Chart, peaking at number 79. The album version of "I'd Like To" was included on the soundtrack to the 2009 film He's Just Not That Into You.

Music video
The music video for "I'd Like To" filmed in Los Angeles in November 2006. It starts with Rae at a formal pool party. Later she walks through some trees and plants and appears on a street. She goes walking down the street and trading accessories with people on the street. The video ends with Rae at a more fun pool party.

Track listings
UK CD single #1
"I'd Like To" (Radio Edit)
"No Love Child"

UK CD single #2
"I'd Like To" (Radio Edit)
"I Won't Let You Lie to Yourself"
"I'd Like To" (Weekender Mix)
"I'd Like To" (video)

UK 7" single
A. "I'd Like To" (Weekender Mix)
B. "I Won't Let You Lie To Yourself"

Mexican digital download #1
"I'd Like To" (Radio Edit)
"No Love Child"

Mexican digital download #2
"I'd Like To" (Radio Edit)
"I Won't Let You Lie to Yourself"
"I'd Like To" (Weekender Mix)

Credits and personnel
Credits adapted from the liner notes of Corinne Bailey Rae.

 Corinne Bailey Rae – backing vocals, lead vocals, percussion, songwriting
 Justin Broad – drum programming, engineering
 Livingston Brown – bass guitar
 Jim Corry – tenor saxophone
 Tommy D – drum programming, keyboards, mixing, production, songwriting
 Paul Herman – acoustic guitar, electric guitar, mixing, production, songwriting
 Jason Rae – alto saxophone, baritone saxophone
 Malcolm Strachan – trumpet

Charts

References

2005 songs
2007 singles
Corinne Bailey Rae songs
EMI Records singles
Songs written by Corinne Bailey Rae